Old District 10 Schoolhouse, sometimes referred to as the Little Red Schoolhouse, is a 5-room former schoolhouse located in Middleburg Heights, Ohio. Built in 1912, the building was the site of Middleburg's first city hall, as well as a speakeasy during Prohibition and a railroad way station. It was then bought by Harvey Cross in 1940 and was used as his private home until his death in 1970.

Sitting vacant since then, the former schoolhouse has since deteriorated to the point of being listed on Preservation Ohio's list of most endangered historic sites in 2015.

In September 2015, the Middleburg Heights Historical Society signed an option to buy the schoolhouse, intending to make the building a museum and cultural center.

References

School buildings on the National Register of Historic Places in Ohio
School buildings completed in 1912
Education in Cuyahoga County, Ohio
National Register of Historic Places in Cuyahoga County, Ohio
Schoolhouses in the United States
Buildings and structures in Cuyahoga County, Ohio
1912 establishments in Ohio